Momčilo Janković (Serbian Cyrillic: Момчило Јанковић; 24 November 1883 – 27 November 1944) was a Serbian politician in the Nazi-controlled Government of National Salvation in 1941.

Career
He was elected in 1938 as a deputy of the Yugoslav Radical Union Milan Stojadinović in the December election in 1938. Then he moved to Belgrade where he worked as a lawyer. He was appointed Minister of the Presidency Council in late August 1941, but due to disagreements with other ministers he left the government in early October. During his short tenure as Minister he was one of the signators of Order of Harsh Courts, in which it is prescribed that "everyone who exposes communist or anarchist by words or acts or is a member of such organisation will be punished by death.

Death and rehabilitation
He was sentenced to death by military court of First Proletarian Corps in 1944. In February 2012, he was rehabilitated by the High Court in Belgrade.

References

1883 births
1944 deaths
Politicians from Niš
Executed Serbian collaborators with Nazi Germany
People killed by Yugoslav Partisans